Bergaris malayica is a species of moth of the family Cossidae. It is found in Malaysia and on Borneo and Sumatra. The habitat consists of lowland forests, including mangrove, swamp or alluvial forests.

The fore- and hindwings are dark blackish brown.

References

Moths described in 1957
Zeuzerinae